Pradeep Chandrasekharan Nair or shortly known as Pradeep Chandran, is an Indian actor who appears in Malayalam films and television. He is best known for his role of Kunjali Marakkar in the tele serial 'Kunjali Marakkar' in 2010 and DCP Abhiram IPS in Malayalam television serial Karuthamuthu.

Early life 
Pradeep was born in Thiruvananthapuram, Kerala, to Chandrasekharan Nair, who is Retired Director from Short Hand Bureau of Special Branch CID, Kerala Police Department, and Valsala C Nair. He has an elder brother Pramod Chandran. Pradeep completed his master's degree in Business Administration from VLB Janakiammal College of Engineering and Technology, Anna University and then worked in Bangalore for an insurance company before entering into movies.

Career 
Pradeep made his acting debut in 2007 with director Major Ravi’s Mission 90 Days, where he played the role of a commando along with Mammooty, the top investigating officer. After this he appeared in multiple movies like Kurukshetra, Kandahar, Ividam Swargamanu, Lokpal, Geethaanjali, Loham, Oppam, Drishyam, 12th Man. He has shared screen space with actor Mohanlal in many of his movies. Pradeep has also acted in a Sanskrit movie Madhurasmitham മധുരസ്മിതം as an IAS Officer where he can be seen encouraging school students on life lessons.

Pradeep made his television debut in 2010 through serial “Kunjali Marakkar” on Asianet, for which he won Asianet Television Awards 2011 for Best Debut Actor. His most notable work in television came across in the year 2017, when he got the opportunity to play the role of DCP Abhiram IPS in Malayalam television serial Karuthamuthu, which made Pradeep popular among the Malayalee audience.

In January 2020, he entered as a contestant in the Malayalam reality TV show Bigg Boss Season 2.

Personal life
On 12 July 2020, he married Anupama Ramachandran.

Filmography

Television

Serials

Programs

Reality shows

Web series

Awards and nominations

Asianet Television Awards, 2011 
 Best Debutant Actor – Kunjali Marakkar

Asianet Television Awards, 2018 
 Most popular Actor (Nominated) – Karuthamuthu
 Best pair (Nominated) – Karuthamuthu

References

External links 
 

1981 births
Living people
Bigg Boss Malayalam contestants
Male actors from Kerala
Male actors in Malayalam cinema
21st-century Indian male actors
Male actors in Malayalam television